"Room 2426" is the fifty-sixth episode, overall (the twenty-first episode of the third season), of the television series The Twilight Zone. In this episode, a prisoner of a totalitarian state tries to convince his cellmate that they have the power to teleport outside their cell using only their minds.

Plot
In an unidentified totalitarian state, a scientist named Martin Decker is locked away and interrogated with electrodes in an effort to make him reveal the location of his notebooks, which contain a formula for efficiently killing locusts. Martin refuses to talk for fear the formula will be modified to create a biological weapon.

Martin, after days of interrogation, is joined by a cellmate. This new inmate, Joseph, says he is there to help Martin escape, through his friends on the outside. Joseph claims that using his mind he can teleport anywhere. Martin points out the scientific absurdity of matter teleportation, and Joseph is unable to produce a reasonable answer to his objections. However, during interrogation Martin abruptly finds himself and Joseph sitting in a cafe. Upon awakening in his cell, Martin concludes that their trip was a dream induced by the drugs used to interrogate them. Joseph insists that it was a real demonstration of teleportation, and convinces Martin to try doing the transporting himself.

Following Joseph's instructions, Martin concentrates and wakes up in a safe house with Joseph, who warns him not to open the window curtains so that they will not be spotted. Martin puts his hand in hot tea and burns himself, confirming he is not dreaming. Joseph points out that they must destroy Martin's notebooks, and asks their location. Becoming suspicious, Martin says he will get them himself, but Joseph points out that as a well-known scientist, Martin is sure to be recognized if he goes out. Martin gives Joseph a false location for the notebooks, and once Joseph has left, he pulls open the curtains to find a wall with speakers blaring recorded street noise. The entire safe house is a facade inside the prison. As Joseph turns over the information to the head interrogator, Ostroff, Martin disappears in a flash of light. Joseph is mystified, pointing out that the teleportation was just a deception to make Martin think he was outside the prison, so Martin could not have actually teleported. Now free, Martin burns the notebooks in a campfire. His means of escape is left unexplained.

External links
 

1989 American television episodes
The Twilight Zone (1985 TV series season 3) episodes
Dystopian television episodes

fr:Chambre 2426